Graham Clinton Koonce (born May 15, 1975) is a former Major League Baseball first baseman. In , he played for the Kansas City Royals' Triple-A club, the Omaha Royals. In 2003, he played for the Oakland Athletics. He was selected by the Detroit Tigers in 60th Round of  amateur entry draft.

References

External links

1975 births
Living people
Oakland Athletics players
Nashville Sounds players
Sportspeople from El Cajon, California
Chico Heat players
Tri-City Posse players
Pacific Coast League MVP award winners
Bristol Tigers players
Fayetteville Generals players
Indianapolis Indians players
Jamestown Jammers players
Midland RockHounds players
Mobile BayBears players
Omaha Royals players
Portland Beavers players
Rancho Cucamonga Quakes players
Richmond Braves players
Sacramento River Cats players